The 1972 United States Senate election in Idaho took place on November 7, 1972. Incumbent Republican Senator Leonard B. Jordan did not run for re-election. Republican U.S. Representative James A. McClure was elected to succeed him over Democrat Bud Davis.

Republican primary

Candidates
George V. Hansen, congressman from Pocatello
James A. McClure, congressman from Payette
Robert E. Smylie, former three-term governor (1955–1967)
 Glenn Wegner, physician-attorney from Kendrick

Results

Democratic primary

Candidates
Rose Bowman, activist from Boise
Bud Davis, president of Idaho State University
Byron Johnson, attorney from Boise
W. Anthony Park, attorney general

Results

General election

Results

See also 
 1972 United States Senate elections

References 

1972
Idaho
United States Senate